Southern Lady may refer to:

Songs 
 "Southern Lady", by Doc Watson, from the album Doc and the Boys
 "Southern Lady", by Donna Fargo, from the album On the Move
 "Southern Lady", by Jimmy Harnen, from the album Can't Fight the Midnight
 "Southern Lady", by Joe Cocker, from the album Luxury You Can Afford
 "Southern Lady", by Rita Coolidge, from the album Anytime...Anywhere